Boy Lake may refer to:

Boy Lake (Cass County, Minnesota)
Boy Lake Township, Cass County, Minnesota
Boy Lake (Glacier County, Montana), a lake in Glacier National Park (U.S.)